Splashgirl (initiated 2003 in Oslo, Norway) is a Norwegian jazz ensemble comprising the three young musicians Andreas Stensland Løwe (piano and electronics), Jo Berger Myhre (doublebass and tone generator) and Andreas Lønmo Knudsrød (drums, percussion and sounds), playing original music.

Biography 
Since 2007, Splashgirl has released four highly acclaimed albums Doors. Keys. (2007), Arbor (2009), Pressure (2011) and Field Day Rituals (2013), has played a great number of concerts in Europe, USA and Japan, and collaborated with musicians like Sidsel Endresen, Jan Bang, Eyvind Kang, Mari Kvien Brunvoll, Randall Dunn and Timothy Mason.

Discography 

2007: Doors. Keys. (AIM Records)
2009: Arbor (Hubro Music)
2011: Splashgirl / Huntsville (Hubro Music)
2011: Pressure (Hubro Music)
2013: Field Day Rituals (Hubro Music)
2016: Hibernation (Hubro Music)
2018: Sixth Sense (Hubro Music)

References

External links 

Splashgirl at All About Jazz

Norwegian jazz ensembles
Norwegian experimental musical groups
Musical groups established in 2003
2003 establishments in Norway
Musical groups from Oslo
Hubro Music artists